Meikle Bin is a peak in the Campsie Fells in Central Scotland. The hill is a prominent local landmark for the people of the towns surrounding the Campsie Fells. It was the site of a fatal accident in January 1950, when a Fairey Firefly of the Royal Navy Fleet Air Arm crashed just below the summit in low cloud while en route to HMS Sanderling Naval Air Station. Both crewmen were killed on impact. Wreckage can be seen on the north and west slopes.

On a clear day, Scotland's iconic east coast and west coast rock islands, Bass Rock and Ailsa Craig respectively, can be seen from the summit, a range of almost 120 miles.

References

Marilyns of Scotland
Mountains and hills of Stirling (council area)